The Fisher Studio Houses are a complex of 12 art moderne style residential units in Chicago, Illinois, United States.  The houses were designed in 1936 by Andrew Rebori and Edgar Miller for Frank Fisher, Jr. It was designated a Chicago Landmark on July 31, 1996.

References

Houses completed in 1936
Houses in Chicago
Chicago Landmarks